The Rajiv–Longowal Accord, was an accord signed by then Prime Minister of India Rajiv Gandhi and Akali leader of Punjab Harchand Singh Longowal on 24 July 1985. The government accepted the demands of Shiromani Akali Dal who in turn agreed to withdraw their agitation.

The accord attracted opposition from several orthodox Sikh leaders of Punjab as well as from the politicians of Haryana.  Some of its promises could not be fulfilled due to the disagreements.  Harchand Singh Longowal was assassinated by the Sikh militants opposed to the accord.

Provisions
The following were the provisions of the accord:

Opposition to the accord

Punjab
On 26 July, Harchand Singh Longowal announced that the accord was unanimously approved by a congregation of former MPs, MLAs, ministers and jathedars. However, Gurcharan Singh Tohra (SGPC President) and Prakash Singh Badal opposed every clause of the accord. Even after a meeting between Longowal, Tohra, Badal and Surjit Singh Barnala, the differences persisted. On 25 July, a group of Akali Dal leaders rejected the accord, calling it a "sell-out". Joginder Singh, the father of Jarnail Singh Bhindranwale, presided over an Akali Dali meeting, where he described Longowal, Barnala and Balwant Singh as traitors to the Sikh panth. The resolution passed at the meeting stated that these leaders did not represent the Sikh masses, and accused Longowal of diluting the Anandpur Sahib Resolution.

Haryana
The Haryana Chief Minister Bhajan Lal the HPCC (I) President Sultan Singh approved of the accord. However, the five opposition parties in Haryana - Lok Dal, BJP, Janata Party, Congress (S) and Congress (J) - declared that they would observe Haryana bandh on 31 July to protest against the accord. After a rally in Rohtak, 29 members of the Haryana State Assembly resigned on 9 August. The protesters objected to the following:

 Consideration being given to the Anandpur Sahib Resolution, which the protestors believed to be the root cause of the trouble in Punjab
 Soft treatment being meted out to those who had deserted the Army
 "Absolutely vague" settlement regarding which territories would be transferred to Haryana in lieu of Chandigarh
 Imposition of a ceiling on the use of the Ravi-Beas waters as per the current use: the protesters pointed out that Punjab was using more water than its allocated share, while Haryana was using less water than its share
 Uncertainty regarding who will control the headworks

See also
Indira–Sheikh Accord

References

External links
 Rajiv-Longowal Memorandum of Settlement (Accord), 24 July 1985

1980s in Punjab, India
Insurgency in Punjab
1985 in India
Internal treaties of India